World of Trombones is an album by American trombonist, composer and arranger Slide Hampton, recorded in 1979 and first released on the West 54 label.

Reception

AllMusic reviewer Ron Wynn described it as an "ambitious project with nine trombonists merging their skills under the leadership of Slide Hampton" and stated "Hampton's arrangements are excellent, but there's more emphasis on performance style than real solo development."

Track listing
 "Chorale" (Slide Hampton) - 1:22
 "Lester Leaps In" (Lester Young) - 4:27
 "'Round Midnight" (Thelonious Monk, Cootie Williams, Bernie Hanighen) - 4:35
 "Donna Lee" (Charlie Parker) - 7:17
 "Con Alma" (Dizzy Gillespie) - 7:48
 "Lament" (J. J. Johnson) - 5:30
 "Impressions" (John Coltrane) - 5:59

Personnel
Slide Hampton - trombone, arranger, conductor
Clifford Adams, Jr., Clarence Banks, Curtis Fuller, Janice Robinson, Tyrone Jefferson, Steve Turre, Angel 'Papo' Vasquez - trombone
Earl McIntyre, Douglas Purviance - bass trombone
Albert Dailey - piano
Ray Drummond - bass 
Leroy Williams - drums

References 

Slide Hampton albums
1979 albums
West 54 Records albums
Black Lion Records albums